Robert Butler may refer to:

Politicians 
Robert Butler (diplomat) (1897–1955), U.S. ambassador to Australia (1946–48) and Cuba (1948–1951)
Robert Butler (MP), 16th-century Member of Parliament for Bristol
Robert Butler (U.S. commander) (1786–1860), U.S. commander receiving the former East Florida for the United States in 1821, from Spain
Robert Butler (Virginia politician) (1784–1853), American, treasurer of the state of Virginia, U.S.
Cuthbert Butler (politician) (Robert John Cuthbert Butler, 1889–1950), member of the Legislative Assembly of Queensland, Australia
Robert L. Butler (born 1927), American politician, twelve-term mayor of Marion, Illinois, U.S.
Robert R. Butler (1881–1933), American politician, judge, and Representative from Oregon, U.S.
Rob Butler (politician) (born 1967), Conservative British MP for Aylesbury since 2019

Sports 
Robert Butler (cricketer) (1852–1916), English cricketer
Bob Butler (1891–1959), American football player
Bobby Butler (American football) (born 1959), American football player
Bobby Butler (ice hockey) (born 1987), American ice hockey player
Rob Butler (baseball) (born 1970), Canadian baseball player
Rob Butler (rugby league), English rugby league player

Others 
Robert Butler (artist) (1943–2014), one of the Florida Highwaymen
Robert Butler (criminal) (1851–1905), New Zealand and Australian murderer and career criminal
Robert Butler (director) (born 1927), American film and television director
Robert Butler (obesity) (1972–2015), one of the world's heaviest people
Robert Neil Butler (1927–2010), American physician and the first director of the United States' National Institute on Aging
Robert Olen Butler (born 1945), American writer
Sir Reginald Butler, 1st Baronet (Robert Reginald Frederick Butler, 1866–1933), English businessman
Robert Butler Jr. (1994–2011), perpetrator of the Millard South High School shooting

See also 
Bert Butler (disambiguation)